Jairo Arrieta Obando (born 25 August 1983) is a Costa Rican professional footballer, who plays as a forward for A.D.R. Jicaral.

Club career

Costa Rica
Arrieta was born in Nicoya, Costa Rica. Before moving to Deportivo Saprissa, he played for Guanacasteca and their successors Brujas. While with Saprissa, Arrieta scored 48 goals in 178 league matches. He also played an important part in Saprissa's Costa Rican league titles in 2006–07, 2007-08 Apertura, 2007-08 Clausura, 2008-09 Apertura, and 2010 Clausura.

Columbus Crew
In April 2012, Arrieta signed a -year agreement with Columbus Crew, moving to play outside of Costa Rica for the first time in his career. Arrieta made his MLS debut for the Crew on 14 July 2012, playing 62 minutes in a loss to Sporting Kansas City at home. This came just 17 days after 27 June transfer window opened. Two weeks later, in a rematch at Kansas City, Arrieta scored his first MLS goal in the 17th minute of the match, following with the game winner in the 34th minute. After only his third game in MLS, Arrieta was named League Player of the Week with a 2-goal performance in a Columbus win against Sporting Kansas City.

D.C. United
Orlando City SC selected Arrieta in the 6th round of the 2014 MLS Expansion Draft. He was later traded to D.C. United ahead of the 2015 season in exchange for an international roster spot. In his debut for D.C. United, he scored in the 58th minute to secure a 1-0 win against the Montreal Impact. Arrieta's option for the 2016 season was declined by D.C. United.

He scored 5 goals and recorded 2 assists in his 27 appearances for D.C.

New York Cosmos
Arrieta signed with New York Cosmos of the North American Soccer League on January 14, 2016.

International career
Arrieta played with the Costa Rica under-23 team at the 2004 Summer Olympics.

He made his senior debut for Costa Rica in a December 2011 friendly match against Cuba and has, as of January 2014, earned a total of 15 caps, scoring 4 goals. He has represented his country in 1 FIFA World Cup qualification match and played at the 2013 Copa Centroamericana. His two goals in the tournament, his first two for his country, were enough to earn him the Golden Boot award as the tournament's top scorer. Because of his performance at the Copa Centroamericana, Arrieta was called up by Costa Rica for their World Cup qualifying match against Panama on 6 February 2013.

He also played at the 2013 CONCACAF Gold Cup.

International goals
Scores and results list Costa Rica's goal tally first.

Personal life
Arrieta holds a U.S. green card which qualifies him as a domestic player for MLS roster purposes.

Honors

Individual
Golden Boot Winner – 2013 Copa Centroamericana

References

External links
 
 
 

1983 births
Living people
People from Guanacaste Province
Association football forwards
Costa Rican footballers
Costa Rican expatriate footballers
Costa Rica international footballers
Olympic footballers of Costa Rica
Footballers at the 2004 Summer Olympics
2013 Copa Centroamericana players
2013 CONCACAF Gold Cup players
Brujas FC players
Deportivo Saprissa players
C.S. Herediano footballers
A.D. San Carlos footballers
Columbus Crew players
D.C. United players
New York Cosmos (2010) players
Major League Soccer players
North American Soccer League players
Liga Nacional de Fútbol de Guatemala players
Liga FPD players
Copa Centroamericana-winning players
Costa Rican expatriate sportspeople in the United States
Costa Rican expatriate sportspeople in Guatemala
Expatriate soccer players in the United States
Expatriate footballers in Guatemala